Brandon Adam Buckley (born 21 September 2000) is an English professional footballer who plays as an attacking midfielder for Cleethorpes Town.

Career

Grimsby Town
Born in Grimsby, North East Lincolnshire, Buckley came through the youth ranks at Grimsby Town as an under-nine, he signed a contract in 2016 for the U18's academy aged 15 years old. He then signed a new contract in May 2017. Buckley was made academy captain in the 2018/19 season and represented the reserve team on a regular basis.

Buckley was promoted to the club's first team in the summer of 2018 under the management of Michael Jolley, making his professional debut on 9 October 2018, coming on as a substitute in the 86th minute against Doncaster Rovers in the EFL Trophy.

Cleethorpes Town
On 1 August 2019, Buckley was loaned out to Cleethorpes Town alongside his teammate, Jock Curran, until 31 January 2020.

Following his released by Grimsby, Buckley re-joined Cleethorpes on a permanent deal.

Personal life
Buckley is the grandson of former Walsall striker and Grimsby Town manager Alan Buckley, and the son of Adam Buckley.

Career statistics

References

External links
Brandon Buckley profile at the Grimsby Town F.C. website

2000 births
Living people
Footballers from Grimsby
Association football midfielders
English Football League players
Grimsby Town F.C. players
Cleethorpes Town F.C. players
English footballers